Clistoconchidae is a family of bivalves belonging to the order Anomalodesmata.

Genera:
 Clistoconcha Smith, 1910

References

Anomalodesmata
Bivalve families